Two vessels of the British Royal Navy have been named HMS Acacia.

 , an  sloop launched in 1915 and sold in 1922.
 , a  trawler launched in 1940 and sold in 1946.

Royal Navy ship names